Tellanur  is a village in the southern state of Karnataka, India. It is located in the Kollegal taluk of Chamarajanagar district.This is a gram panchayath which includes surrounding villages of Balagunase, Ankanapura, Masti gowdana doddi, Bolegowdana doddi, Chikkalluru.Tellanuru Maramma and Dannavva is the most popular god's in this area.They worship Malemahadeshwara,Kendagannayya also.

Demographics
 India census, Tellanur had a population of 6993 with 3575 males and 3418 females.

See also
 Chamarajanagar
 Districts of Karnataka

References

External links
 http://Chamarajanagar.nic.in/

Villages in Chamarajanagar district